Moving Forward in Reverse: Greatest Hits is Saliva's 2010 greatest hits compilation album. Along with the group's most successful singles, the album also features one new song, "Time to Shine", which was named the official theme song to WWE's 2010 edition of Extreme Rules.

Track listing

2010 greatest hits albums
Saliva (band) albums